Tussaneeya Karnsomnut  (born 14 December 1994), who goes by the nickname Preaw, is a Thai model and actress.

Early life and education 
Tussaneeya was born on December 14, 1994, graduating from high school from Satree Nonthaburi School  Tussaneeya  is a child of school activities. Have special talents such as Thai dancing and melodious singing  Tussaneeya began her career in the industry by shooting in magazines. Currently, Tussaneeya graduated with a bachelor's degree from the Faculty of Communication Arts. PhD Bangkok University

Career 
Tussaneeya is signed under Channel 7 (Thailand), her first lakorn was Mae Poo Preaw in 2012 with Auan Rangsit Sirananon. In 2013 she was cast for drama Dome Thong as Wirongrong and Plubpleung where she is paired with Vee Veraparb Suparbpaiboon . She played 2 roles for this drama. In 2014 she had acted in three dramas, Leh Nang Hon, Kom Paya Bath and Prai Payakorn. In 2016, she was paired with Weir Sukollawat Kanarot for drama Morrasoom Sawaat where she played character Kumarika. In 2017 she played 2 drama Plerng Pranang and Wang Nang Hong. She won Best Supporting Actress for her role in Plerng Pranang as Jao Sao Pinmanee. For the drama Wang Nang Hong she is paired with Cee Siwat Chottichaicharin.

In 2018, she once again paired with Vee Veraparb Suparbpaiboon and Bank Artit Tangwiboonpanit for drama Rabum Marn. She was paired with Es Kantapong Bamrongrak for drama Sarawat Yai in 2019. She once again paired with Es Kantapong Bamrongrak for drama Lah Tah Chon in 2020. She is paired with BigM Krittarit Butprohm back to back for two drama, Pleng Ruk Pleng Bpeun and Peek Hong both for 2019 and 2020. She currently filming her upcoming drama Buang Wimala where she will act with Mick Tongraya and Pupe Kesarin Noiphueng .

Filmography

Television Series

MC

Television 
 20 : ทุกวัน เวลา น.-น. On Air ร่วมกับ

Online 
 2021 : PREAWWNP - EP.0 On Air YouTuber:Preawwnp

Discography

Drama Ost

References

External links 
  on Channel 7
 Tussaneeya Karnsomnut on instagram
 https://www.facebook.com/preawtussaneeya.fanclub

1994 births
Living people
Tussaneeya Karnsomnut
Tussaneeya Karnsomnut
Tussaneeya Karnsomnut
Tussaneeya Karnsomnut
Tussaneeya Karnsomnut
Thai television personalities
Tussaneeya Karnsomnut
Tussaneeya Karnsomnut